If You Had Wings was an attraction at Walt Disney World. It was a two-person Omnimover dark ride in Tomorrowland in the Magic Kingdom, sponsored by Eastern Air Lines. It featured travel destinations throughout the Caribbean and elsewhere, all of which were serviced by Eastern. It had an eponymous theme song by Buddy Baker.

History
If You Had Wings was located across from what originally was Flight To The Moon but later became Mission to Mars. The ride was sponsored by Eastern Air Lines, whose initial investment was reportedly $10 million.
Not well known or much promoted, waiting lines for IYHW were nonexistent or short even when the park was crowded. Nevertheless, the ride was imbued with the particular gentle charm and flavor characteristic of Disney productions and Walt Disney World more specifically. It was nicely air-conditioned and also free, when admission tickets were required of rides in the park.

If You Had Wings was a four-and-a-half-minute dark ride based on Disney's Omnimover system. It moved at a leisurely pace throughout. It was structurally similar to the Disneyland attraction Adventure Thru Inner Space, which might be considered its predecessor; both were designed by Claude Coats. The theme music was written by Buddy Baker with lyrics by X Atencio.

Attraction experience
The ride began with projections of animated silhouettes of seagulls and airplanes sweeping past on the walls, enhancing the feeling of motion and gently suggesting flight. Riders passed through a series of colorful theater-like sets with embedded small screens looping rear-projected short filmed scenes, while their cars swiveled on their bases to direct riders toward points of interest. In all, thirty-eight 16mm projectors were used in the attraction. The scenes showcased various Eastern destinations and appealed to potential tourists with straw-hat markets, fishermen, limbo dancers, steel drum bands, and more. Many scenes had their own special sound effects. The omnipresent theme music featured a chorus of singers tunefully chanting,
If you had wings, if you had wings
If you had wings, had wings, had wings, had wings
The music did not succeed in masking the clicking of the hidden projectors, which was clearly audible throughout most of the ride.

The following locations were represented: Mexico,
Bermuda, Puerto Rico, the Bahamas (where a tropically attired traffic cop blew a whistle to direct a flock of flamingos in one direction, pedestrians and vehicles in the other), Jamaica (where the ride's only 35mm projector showed a pod of bathing-suit-clad young people clambering up the rocks at Dunn's River Falls), Trinidad, and New Orleans (where shadows of blowing jazzmen flickered on the wall), all of which Eastern Air Lines offered as destinations at the time.

Having viewed this sequence of site sets, riders entered the "speed room", an ellipsoid onto the interior of which were projected snippets of first-person movies of an airplane taking off, a train, water skis, motorcycles, airboats, and a few other scenes. The clips were projected on the walls by a 70mm projector. The ovoid screen encompassed the viewers' peripheral vision. Furthermore, the vehicle reclined in the speed room, and a breeze was blown on riders. The wraparound images, in combination with the motion and reclining angle of the vehicle and a blast of air, arguably constituted an early attempt at virtual reality. The images were to some extent blurry and distorted, unlike Disney's sharper Circle-Vision 360 technology; it rather resembled the fuzzy Cinema 180 shows featured in many contemporary amusement parks.

The speed room was followed by the "mirror room", where two more 70mm projectors produced images of snow-covered mountains appearing on large screens and were reflected in enormous floor-to-ceiling mirrors, and the music became a wordless symphonic swell of harmonies.

Riders "descended" after exiting the mirror room, and the voice of Orson Welles assured riders,
You do have wings.
You can do all these things.
You can widen your world.
Eastern: the wings of man.
At the time of the ride's inception, "The Wings of Man" was the slogan of Eastern Air Lines. In later years, this passage (spoken by someone other than Welles; perhaps Disney vocal veteran Peter Renaday) ended with a different slogan, "Eastern: we'll be your wings."

Riders disembarked to an area containing an Eastern Air Lines reservation desk. Agents stood ready to assist riders with travel arrangements.

In 1987, Eastern withdrew its sponsorship and the attraction closed on June 1 of that year. Eastern itself went out of business four years later.

Interaction with the WEDway PeopleMover
Large diorama windows, two on the right and one on the left, allowed the Mexico, Jamaica, and Trinidad scenes to be visible to riders on the Tomorrowland Transit Authority (then WEDWay PeopleMover). The window on the left was covered up when If You Had Wings was replaced with Delta Dreamflight.

Successors
After the closing of the original attraction, new attractions were created to inhabit the same space.

If You Could Fly

Subsequent to the closing of IYHW, Disney removed all references to Eastern, changed the name of the ride to If You Could Fly, and re-opened it on June 6, 1987. The sets and films were intact, but the theme music had been replaced. For many fans of the ride the absence of the infectious original music had taken much of the fun out of the attraction, and the opening scene which originally had a film about Eastern had been replaced with footage of flying birds. On January 4, 1989, If You Could Fly was permanently closed.

Delta Dreamflight
Soon after, Delta Air Lines took over sponsorship and made plans to update and remodel the attraction. The replacement was Delta Dreamflight, which made use of the same ride system and floor layout, but all-new scenery and music.

Disney's Take Flight
Delta dropped its sponsorship in June 1996. WDW removed all references to Delta and renamed the attraction Disney's Take Flight. The ride lasted two years, closing in January 1998.

Unlike the wholesale musical change from If You Had Wings to If You Could Fly, Take Flights music was the same as Dreamflights except for minor alterations to the lyrics.

Buzz Lightyear's Space Ranger Spin
Disney decided to use the ride space to promote its popular film, Pixar's Toy Story. The attraction, Buzz Lightyear's Space Ranger Spin, again makes use of the original ride system and floor plan, but now riders can control the rotation of their vehicle via joysticks, and are armed with "laser cannons" to shoot at targets stationed throughout the attraction. Many of the elements in this attraction are similar to If You Had Wings including the speed tunnel with the projections on the walls and the loading and unloading areas. Buzz Lightyear sign above the door is in the shape of a cloud and was painted over after the attraction was renamed.

Influence
Epcot's World of Motion and Horizons dark rides featured Omnimovers in settings similar to the speed room mentioned above.

The El Rio del Tiempo boat ride at the Mexico pavilion at World Showcase, which has since been modified into the Gran Fiesta Tour Starring The Three Caballeros, includes films projected onto small screens embedded in elaborate sets. This, combined with persistent music, miniature films, and dancing animatronics, draws significantly from If You Had Wings.

The theme song "If You Had Wings" can be heard in Tomorrowland at Walt Disney World; it is given a more retro feel, and has no lyrics.

The ride was parodied in The Simpsons episode "Special Edna" in which monstrous robotic Eastern airliners were depicted enslaving the human race.

See also
 Magic Kingdom attraction and entertainment history

References

External links
Widen Your World Fan site including photos of the attraction
 Claude Coats An official appreciation of the late Disney animator and Imagineer Claude Coats.
 Photo of the attraction's exterior.

Amusement rides introduced in 1972
Amusement rides introduced in 1987
Amusement rides that closed in 1987
Amusement rides that closed in 1989
Amusement rides manufactured by Arrow Dynamics
Former Walt Disney Parks and Resorts attractions
Omnimover attractions
Magic Kingdom
Dark rides
Eastern Air Lines
Tomorrowland
1989 disestablishments in Florida
Aviation attractions
Amusement rides using motion pictures
1972 establishments in Florida